The following outline is provided as an overview of and topical guide to British Columbia:

British Columbia is the westernmost of Canada's provinces. It lies between the Pacific Ocean to the west and the province of Alberta to the east. British Columbia was the sixth province to join the Canadian Confederation.

General reference 
 Pronunciation: 
 Common English name(s): British Columbia or "BC"
 Official English name: British Columbia
 Abbreviations and name codes
 Postal symbol: "V"
 ISO 3166-2 code:  CA-BC
 Internet second-level domain:  .bc.ca
 Common endonym(s):   "The Pacific Province", "the Dogwood Province", "Beautiful British Columbia", "Beautiful BC"
 Official endonym(s):  
 Adjectival(s): British Columbia
 Demonym(s): British Columbian

Geography of British Columbia 

Geography of British Columbia
 British Columbia is: a province of Canada
 Location:
 The regions in which British Columbia is located are:
 Northern Hemisphere, Western Hemisphere
 Americas
 North America
 Northern America
 Canada
 Western Canada
 Extreme points of British Columbia
 Population of British Columbia: : 4,254,500 (2005)
 Area of British Columbia: 944,735 km2 (364,764.2 sq mi)
 Atlas of British Columbia

Environment of British Columbia 

 Air pollution in British Columbia
 Climate of British Columbia
 Conservation status of British Columbia salmonids
 Ecology of British Columbia
 Geology of British Columbia
 Protected areas of British Columbia
 Provincial Parks of British Columbia
 Wildlife of British Columbia
 Mammals of British Columbia

Natural geographic features of British Columbia 

 Coast of British Columbia
 Fjords of British Columbia
 Glaciers of British Columbia
 Islands of British Columbia
 Lakes of British Columbia
 Mountains of British Columbia
 Volcanoes of British Columbia
 Mountain ranges of British Columbia
 Plateaus of British Columbia
 Mountain passes of British Columbia
 Peaks on the Alberta–British Columbia border
 Boundary Peaks of the Alaska – British Columbia/Yukon border
 Rivers of British Columbia
 Waterfalls of British Columbia
 Canyons and gorges of British Columbia
 Valleys of British Columbia (see also Regions)
 Hot springs of British Columbia

Regions of British Columbia 

 British Columbia Interior
 Lower Mainland
 Fraser Valley
 Greater Vancouver
 British Columbia Coast
 Vancouver Island

Biogeoclimatic zones, ecozones and ecoregions of British Columbia 

Biogeoclimatic zones of British Columbia

Administrative divisions of British Columbia 

Administrative divisions of British Columbia
 Forest regions and districts of British Columbia
 Ministry of Environment Regions of British Columbia
 BC Parks regions
 Ministry of Tourism regions
 Mining districts of British Columbia
 Health regions of British Columbia
 List of land districts of British Columbia (cadastral survey system)
 Counties of British Columbia (court system)
 School districts in British Columbia
 Assessment areas of British Columbia (property tax)
 Development Regions of British Columbia
 College Regions of British Columbia
 Land and Resource Management Planning Areas of British Columbia
 Ministry of Social Development and Social Innovation Regions
 Ministry of Transportation Regions
Department of Highways Districts

Communities of British Columbia 
 Communities in British Columbia
 Municipalities of British Columbia
 Regional districts of British Columbia
Regional district electoral areas in British Columbia
 Cities of British Columbia
 Urban centres
 Vancouver
 Victoria
 Kelowna
  Abbotsford
 Kamloops
 Nanaimo
 Prince George
 Indian reserves in British Columbia

Demographics of British Columbia 

Demographics of British Columbia

Government and politics of British Columbia 

Politics of British Columbia

 Form of government: Constitutional monarchy
 Capital of British Columbia: Victoria
 Elections in British Columbia
 Political issues
 Cannabis in British Columbia
 Hunting Status On Grizzly Bears in British Columbia, Canada
 Political parties in British Columbia
 Political scandals of British Columbia
 Taxation in Canada

Federal representation 
 Senators

Provincial government of British Columbia

Executive branch 

 Head of state: King of Canada, Charles III
 Head of state's representative (Viceroy): Lieutenant Governor of British Columbia, Janet Austin
 List of lieutenant governors of British Columbia
 Head of government: Premier of British Columbia, David Eby
 Deputy Premier of British Columbia
 Cabinet: Executive Council of British Columbia
 Head of council: Lieutenant Governor in Council, as representative of the King in Right of British Columbia
 British Columbia Government Agencies and Crown Corporations

Legislative branch 

 Parliament of British Columbia, which has 2 components:
 King-in-Parliament (King of Canada), represented in his absence by the Lieutenant-Governor of British Columbia
 Legislative Assembly of British Columbia
 Speaker of the Legislative Assembly of British Columbia

Judicial branch 

Court system of British Columbia
 Court of Appeal of British Columbia
 Supreme Court of British Columbia
 Provincial Court of British Columbia
 County Court of British Columbia
 Counties of British Columbia

Legal framework in British Columbia 

 Cannabis in British Columbia
 Constitution of British Columbia
 Criminal justice system of British Columbia
 Criminal Code
 Capital punishment in British Columbia: none.
 Canada eliminated the death penalty for murder nationwide on July 14, 1976.
 Same-sex marriage in British Columbia

Law enforcement in British Columbia 

List of law enforcement agencies in British Columbia
 British Columbia Provincial Police (defunct)
 Royal Canadian Mounted Police "E" Division
 E-Comm
 British Columbia Sheriff Services

Military in British Columbia 
 Military units in British Columbia (historical)
 Free Company of Volunteers of Catalonia (Spanish Empire - withdrawn)
 Victoria Voltigeurs (disbanded)
 Victoria Pioneer Rifle Corps (aka "African Rifles")
 Pacific Station (Royal Navy - withdrawn)
 Royal Engineers, Columbia Detachment (withdrawn)
 see also Ancient and Honourable Hyack Anvil Battery (now New Westminster Fire Dept, originally RE)
 Royal Marines (withdrawn)
 Canadian Forces bases in British Columbia
 CFB Esquimalt
 CFB Chilliwack
 NRS Aldergrove
 CFB Comox 
 Canadian Forces Camp Chilcotin
 CFMETR, Nanoose Bay
 Seaforth Armoury, Vancouver
 Beatty Street Drill Hall, Vancouver
 Bay Street Drill Hall, Victoria
 Brigadier Angle Armoury, Kelowna, British Columbia Federal Recognized Federal Heritage building 1997 on the Register of the Government of Canada Heritage Buildings.
 Royal Roads Military College (Hatley Park/Royal Roads University)
 British Columbia Armoury, New Westminster
 Deadman's Island (HMCS Discovery Naval Reserve Division), Vancouver
 Defunct military bases in British Columbia
 Fort Rodd Hill (Royal Navy/Marines, defunct/museum)
 CFB Holberg
 CFB Masset
 CFB Matsqui
 CFB Jericho
 Fort Steele (Royal Northwest Mounted Police)
 Military units in British Columbia
 The British Columbia Dragoons
 The British Columbia Regiment (Duke of Connaught's Own)
 Seaforth Highlanders of Canada
 Royal Westminster Regiment
 Militia units in British Columbia
 Rocky Mountain Rangers
 Cadet units in British Columbia
 2290 British Columbia Regiment (Duke of Connaught's Own) Cadet Corps

History of British Columbia 

History of British Columbia

History of British Columbia, by period 
Colony of British Columbia (1858–1866)
Colony of British Columbia (1866–1871)

History of British Columbia, by region 

 History of Vancouver
 History of Victoria
 History of Kelowna
 History of Abbotsford
 History of Kamloops
 History of Nanaimo
 History of Prince George

History of British Columbia, by subject 

 Ghost towns in British Columbia
 British Columbia Gold Rushes
 Historical ships in British Columbia

Culture of British Columbia 

 Architecture of British Columbia
 Parliament Buildings of British Columbia
 Heritage buildings in Vancouver
 Cannabis in British Columbia
 Cuisine of British Columbia
 Canadian Chinese cuisine
 British Columbia wine
 Languages of British Columbia
 Chinook Jargon
 Museums of British Columbia
 Royal British Columbia Museum
 Order of British Columbia
 Provincial symbols of British Columbia
 Coat of arms of British Columbia
 Flag of British Columbia
 Recreation in British Columbia
 Religion in British Columbia

Heritage sites in British Columbia 
 Historic places in British Columbia
 World Heritage Sites in British Columbia
 Canadian Rocky Mountain Parks in Alberta and British Columbia
 Kluane-Wrangell-St. Elias-Glacier Bay-Tatshenshini-Alsek (partially in Yukon and British Columbia, Canada, and Alaska, United States)
 Gwaii Haanas National Park Reserve and Haida Heritage Site - British Columbia
 Moresby Island
 Ninstints (Skungwai, SGang Gwaay)
 National Historic Sites of Canada in British Columbia
 Heritage buildings in Vancouver

The Arts in British Columbia 
 Music of British Columbia

 Ballet British Columbia https://en.m.wikipedia.org/wiki/Ballet_BC

Sports in British Columbia 

 British Columbia Derby
 British Columbia Hockey League
 British Columbia Lacrosse Association
 Mountain biking in British Columbia
 British Columbia Rugby Union
 British Columbia Soccer Association

Economy and infrastructure of British Columbia 

 Economic rank (by nominal GDP):
 Banking in British Columbia
 Banks and credit unions in Canada
 Communications in British Columbia
 Radio stations in British Columbia
 Television stations in British Columbia
 Currency of British Columbia:
 Mines in British Columbia
 Sales taxes in British Columbia
 Transportation in British Columbia
 Airports in British Columbia
 Roads in British Columbia
 Provincial highways of British Columbia

Education in British Columbia 

 Higher education in British Columbia
 Colleges in British Columbia
 University of British Columbia
 University of British Columbia Library

See also 

 Index of British Columbia–related articles
 List of international rankings
 Outline of geography
 Outline of Canada
 Outline of Alberta
 Outline of Manitoba
 Outline of Nova Scotia
 Outline of Ontario
 Outline of Prince Edward Island
 Outline of Quebec
 Outline of Saskatchewan

References

External links 

 
 Provincial Archives including online photo database
 Vancouver Public Library; Historical Photographs of BC & the Yukon
 B.C. Multicultural Photographs from the Vancouver Public Library - searchable photo database
 BC Govt online map archive

British Columbia
British Columbia